Mesnes Park ((Mains) is a Victorian public park dating from 1878 in Wigan, Greater Manchester, UK.

The elongated  park lies to the north-west of Wigan town centre with its main entrance at the junction of Bridgeman Terrace and Mesnes Park Terrace. It comprises formal flower beds in grass lawns, a pool, children's playgrounds, mini golf, sports grounds and a café.

It has recently undergone a multi-million pound restoration after receiving a grant from the Heritage Lottery Fund.

Listed features
The park itself is Grade II listed and contains a total of seven original Grade II listed features.

The main entrance gateway has carved sandstone piers and double cast iron gates with the Wigan town shield and the date of 1878.

The associated entrance lodge has been refurbished and is used for meetings and weddings.

On the right hand side of the main path (from the entrance to the main Pavilion feature) is the bronze statue of former local MP and benefactor Sir Francis Sharpe Powell. Touching his bronze foot is said to bring good luck.

At the end of the main path is the south-east double flight of sandstone steps up to the Pavilion. At the top of the steps stands a memorial to the soldiers of the Boer War.

The Pavilion is the main feature of the park, with a cafė and two floors of seating. The structure is constructed to an octagonal plan in cast iron, clad on the outside with brick and terracotta tiling.

A second double fight of steps, similar to the south-east flight, leads down from the south-west side of the Pavilion.

The 10-sided bandstand made of cast iron columns with a metal-clad wooden roof has been recently provided with electric power.

History
The land within which Mesnes Park lies was traditionally known as the Mesnes as it was part of the manorial demesnes land. The Rector of Wigan being Lord of the Manor, it formed part of the Wigan Rectory Glebe Estate. By 1847 there were two collieries operating within the boundaries of the present park.

In 1871  of the Mesnes were sold to Wigan Corporation as a site for a Grammar School and public park. The purchase was arranged by Nathaniel Eckersley, the then Mayor of Wigan. A further  of land was leased and included the site of Turner's Colliery which continued in operation until 1880. A competition was held in 1877 for the design of a public park, which was won by John McClean of Castle Donington, who was then awarded the contract to supervise the work.

Nathaniel Eckersley, High Sheriff of Lancashire at that time, performed the opening ceremony in August 1878.

References

Tourist attractions in the Metropolitan Borough of Wigan
Parks and commons in the Metropolitan Borough of Wigan